In personal computer games, a spawn installation is an installed copy of a game that may only be used to play in multiplayer mode, or otherwise limits the amount of single-player content accessible to the user. Additionally, some spawn implementations only allow the user to join games hosted by the installer's cd-key. There are several purposes for a spawn installation, including but not limited to creating added value by allowing the owner of the game to experience the multiplayer mode with friends and demonstrating the game to more potential buyers.

A similar concept (for example, in some Command & Conquer games) is the use of multiple game discs. Each disc contains a discrete portion of the game, such as an individual campaign. Sharing a disc with a friend allows both the owner and the friend to experience the full content of each respective disc, but not at the same time. In contrast with spawn installations, the disadvantage to the multiple-disc approach was that the game could only be shared among as many people as there were discs, while spawn installations could be used on any number of systems.

This concept is very similar to the single-card-multiplayer "Download Play" option that some Nintendo DS games offer (such as Super Mario 64 DS). The difference here, however, is that a spawn installation is installed on the system like a normal program, whereas the Nintendo DS only keeps its downloaded copy in memory while it is powered on.

Games with spawn installation
Carmageddon
Joint Strike Fighter - Innerloop
Need for Speed III: Hot Pursuit - Electronic Arts
Diablo - Blizzard Entertainment
Diablo II - Blizzard Entertainment
StarCraft - Blizzard Entertainment
StarCraft II - Blizzard Entertainment
Warcraft: Orcs & Humans - Blizzard Entertainment
Warcraft II: Tides of Darkness - Blizzard Entertainment
Earth 2150 - Reality Pump
Total Annihilation - Cavedog Entertainment
Disciples: Sacred Lands - Strategy First
Enemy Territory: Quake Wars - id Software
Halo Custom Edition - Gearbox SoftwareDr. Mario Online Rx - NintendoAge of Empires - MicrosoftAge of Empires: The Rise of Rome - MicrosoftAge of Empires II: The Age of Kings - MicrosoftAge of Empires II: The Conquerors Expansion - MicrosoftHeroes of Might and Magic II - The 3DO CompanyHeroes of Might and Magic III - The 3DO CompanyGruntz - Monolith ProductionsWolfenstein: Youngblood'' - Bethesda Softworks

References

Video game development
Video game distribution